Gerrit Zalm (born 6 May 1952) is a retired Dutch politician of the People's Party for Freedom and Democracy (VVD) and businessman.

Zalm studied Economics at the Free University Amsterdam obtaining a Master of Economics degree and worked as a civil servant for the Ministries of Finance, Economic Affairs and the Bureau for Economic Policy Analysis from June 1975 until August 1994 and worked as a professor of Political economy at his alma mater from January 1990 until August 1994. After the election of 1994 Zalm was appointed as Minister of Finance in the Cabinet Kok I taking office on 22 August 1994. After the election of 1998 Zalm continued his position in the Cabinet Kok II. After the election of 2002 Zalm was elected as a Member of the House of Representatives on 23 May 2002. Shortly after the election Party Leader and Parliamentary leader Hans Dijkstal announced he was stepping down and Zalm was anonymously selected as his successor as Leader on 16 May 2002 and became Parliamentary leader on 23 May 2002. For the election of 2003 Zalm served as Lijsttrekker (top candidate) and following a successful cabinet formation that formed the Cabinet Balkenende II was appointed as Deputy Prime Minister and Minister of Finance taking office on 27 May 2003. On 27 November 2004 Zalm announced he was stepping down as Leader in favor of and Parliamentary leader Jozias van Aartsen. The Cabinet Balkenende II fell on 30 June 2006 and was replaced by the caretaker Cabinet Balkenende III with Zalm continuing his offices. In August 2006 Zalm announced his retirement and that he wouldn't stand for the election of 2006.

Zalm retired from active politics at 54 and became active in the private sector as a corporate director, and worked as a banker for the DSB Bank, Fortis Bank and ABN AMRO from July 2007 until February 2017. Following his retirement Zalm became active in the public sector as a non-profit director and served on several state commissions and councils on behalf of the government, and worked as a occasional mediator for coalition agreements. Zalm is known for his abilities as a skillful manager and effective debater and as of  continues to comment on political affairs. He holds the distinction as the longest-serving Minister of Finance with 11 years, 240 days in Dutch history.

Biography

Early life
Gerrit Zalm was born on 6 May 1952 in Enkhuizen in the Province of North Holland. Following his graduation from high school ("HBS-A" level) in Enkhuizen, Zalm began a study in economics at the Vrije Universiteit in Amsterdam, from which he graduated in 1975. In the same year he joined the Ministry of Finance. From 1983 he worked for the Ministry of Economic Affairs, where he eventually became a director. In 1988 he was appointed deputy director of the Centraal Planbureau, a state institution that, among other things, calculates the financial effects of government plans. In 1989 he became director of this institute. In that capacity Zalm had, although not formally a politician, a significant influence on politics. From 1990 he also gave lectures at the Vrije Universiteit.

Politics
Between 22 August 1994 and 22 July 2002, Zalm, member of the People's Party for Freedom and Democracy, was Minister of Finance in the first and second Wim Kok administrations. The Dutch economy being very healthy during those years, he did not experience large difficulties. However, he did introduce certain standards that are in effect until now, among which the Zalmnorm (Zalm standard) which describes a state policy by which the state does not respond extremely to economic fluctuations but just counteracts them. During the first, short Balkenende administration, Zalm was the acting leader of the People's Party for Freedom and Democracy group in parliament. On 27 May 2003 he started his third term as Minister of Finance, in the second Balkenende administration, also serving as Deputy Prime Minister. On 30 June 2006, he succeeded Laurens Jan Brinkhorst as Minister of Economic Affairs, ad interim, with most tasks delegated to Undersecretary Karien van Gennip. On 7 July 2006 Joop Wijn was appointed as the new Minister of Economic Affairs.

Banking
On 26 November 2006, Zalm announced in the Sunday morning talk show Buitenhof that he would step down from politics and would probably seek employment in the private sector. Three months after his 2007 retirement from politics, Zalm went to work for DSB Bank, a company that he had criticized in his earlier role as finance minister for what he considered misleading advertising for consumer credit. He initially held the position of chief economist, but quickly became CFO of the faltering bank after the Dutch central bank DNB had threatened to curtail DSB's financial autonomy.

On 21 November 2008 it was announced by Prime minister Jan Peter Balkenende that Zalm will be the new CEO of the bank resulting from the merger of ABN and Fortis Netherlands, two recently nationalized banks. This new position came under scrutiny after Zalm's previous employer DSB went bankrupt in 2009. The Netherlands Authority for the Financial Markets (AFM) and the central bank both investigated Zalm's role in DSB's final years, with AFM concluding that he was "not competent" and should be dismissed from ABN AMRO's board, while DNB decided to keep Zalm in his position.

Personal
Zalm is a fan of the game of pinball and during his second term as Minister of Finance he had a pinball machine in his department. He is an honorary member of the Dutch Pinball Association. In 2004 he had a cameo appearance in the movie Cool! by Theo van Gogh. In January 2019, in an episode of the Dutch version of Who Do You Think You Are?, it became known that Zalm is related to rebel leader and pirate Pier Gerlofs Donia, through his mother's family.

Decorations

Honorary degrees

References

External links

Official
  Dr. G. (Gerrit) Zalm Parlement & Politiek

 
 

 

 
 

 

 
 

 

 
 

 
 

 

 
 

 

 

 

1952 births
Living people
Commanders of the Order of Orange-Nassau
Danske Bank people
Deputy Prime Ministers of the Netherlands
Directors of the Bureau for Economic Policy Analysis
Directors of Shell plc
Dutch agnostics
Dutch autobiographers
Dutch bankers
Dutch chief executives in the finance industry
Dutch corporate directors
Dutch financial advisors
Dutch financial analysts
Dutch people of Scottish descent
Financial economists
Dutch conservative liberals
Grand Officiers of the Légion d'honneur
Grand Officers of the Order of the Crown (Belgium)
Knights Commander of the Order of Merit of the Federal Republic of Germany
Knights Grand Cross of the Order of Merit of the Italian Republic
Leaders of the People's Party for Freedom and Democracy
Members of the House of Representatives (Netherlands)
Members of the Social and Economic Council
Ministers of Economic Affairs of the Netherlands
Ministers of Finance of the Netherlands
People from Enkhuizen
Politicians from The Hague
People's Party for Freedom and Democracy politicians
Pinball players
Political economists
Recipients of the Grand Cross of the Order of Leopold II
Vrije Universiteit Amsterdam alumni
Academic staff of Vrije Universiteit Amsterdam
20th-century Dutch civil servants
20th-century Dutch economists
20th-century Dutch educators
20th-century Dutch politicians
21st-century Dutch businesspeople
21st-century Dutch economists
21st-century Dutch educators
21st-century Dutch male writers
21st-century Dutch politicians